Heterotermes ceylonicus is a species of subterranean termite of the family Rhinotermitidae. It is native to India and Sri Lanka. It is a wood destroying termites, which damage to logs, wooden structures of both natural and man-made such as tree stumps of Gravellia and Hevea brasiliensis, and tea plantations. It can be also found in mounds of Hypotermes obscuriceps.

References

External links
A PRELIMINARY INVENTORY OF SUBTERRANEAN TERMITES
COMPARISON OF TERMITE ASSEMBLAGES IN TWO LOWLAND FOREST TYPES IN THE KNUCKLES REGION
Termites on Ceylon tea estates.

Rhinotermitidae
Insects of India
Insects of Sri Lanka
Insects described in 1911